Ablabesmyia phatta is a species of Chironomidae flies described by Egger in 1863.  No sub-species specified in Catalogue of Life.

References

Tanypodinae
Insects described in 1863